Cordelia Bugeja (born 5 March 1976 in Chichester, West Sussex) is a British actress, best known for her roles as Julie in Not Going Out, Nikki in EastEnders, Melanie Hart in Family Affairs, and sex worker Kate in Respectable.

Career 
From 1993 to 1994 she appeared in the ITV sitcom Conjugal Rites as  Gillian Masefield. In 2006, she appeared briefly in an episode of sitcom Not Going Out as waitress Julie. (The producers had said in an interview that they had promised Bugeja a role after she stood in for someone at a read-through, but were forced to give her only a small part as Respectable was taking up most of her time.)

She appeared in over two dozen British TV commercials, most notably the award-winning campaign for Sure antiperspirant with the punchline "Thank god you dumped him first!", and a hugely successful campaign for Yakult yoghurt drink.

She had guest roles in The Bill once in 2005, where she appeared as the girlfriend of a man who was holding his dad and three officers hostage at St Hugh's and the second time in 2007 when she appeared in three episodes as Nina Lloyd, the ex-partner of CPS solicitor Matt Hinkley, who had driven her to a mental breakdown.

She has also appeared in Agatha Christie's Poirot as Lilly Luxmore, in Cards on the Table in 2006; the 2008 British movie The Crew as Debs and in the Doctors episode Someone Else's Shoes as Branwen Owen in 2013.

Filmography

Film

Television

See also
 Bugeja (surname)

References

External links

 Cordelia Bugeja Official Website
 Cordelia Bugeja on Twitter

1976 births
Living people
English television actresses
People from Chichester
British people of Maltese descent